Community housing in Australia is not-for-profit affordable housing provided by community housing organisations known as  Community Housing Providers (CHPs). These organisations have varying modes of operation and structure, and different types of stock. Any budget surplus in CHPs must be used to maintain existing housing, to provide better services for tenants or to help finance new properties. Although independent, the CHPs are regulated by the state, and commonly receive public funding. Most of their stock is owned by public housing authorities (SHAs) in each State, and the CHPs manage the tenancies using the rent received from tenants.

Community housing expanded from the 1990s in Australia, because of inadequate funding for public housing, and because it was geared around delivering housing to people with complex needs who required support services. In 2020, 103,900 dwellings were under community housing management, or 24% of the social housing stock.

The  Community Housing Industry Association (CHIA) is the peak body representing all CHPs. It provides national advocacy and representation. The State branches of CHIA conduct training and networking activities for housing and associated service workers.

Overview 
Community housing is a diverse sector in Australia. Stock under management has more than tripled from 2006, mostly due to transfers from public housing. 

About 370 organisations are registered nationally, of which 42 are Tier 1, operating at scale. In 2020 they managed 104,000 properties, about 24% of all social housing. The tenants are, as with public housing, overwhelmingly recipients of social security benefits, and the majority have complex needs. New South Wales has almost half of all community tenancies.

Models for community housing are quite varied. The main categories of CHP by purpose are:

Community Housing Associations (CHAs). These manage housing for very low income people and build a portfolio of dwellings where clients can be permanently housed. Some cater to specialised client groups: for example, women’s housing or indigenous housing.
 Affordable housing organisations. These provide housing at 80% to 90% of market rents to moderate income people. Most of these organisations arose out of the NRAS scheme.
 Homelessness organisations. These provide temporary assistance or crisis housing for those at risk of homelessness. They  maintain a relatively small housing stock, but may be large organisations in terms of budget and number of employees (for example, Launch Housing is the largest CHP in Victoria). Some are divisions within larger religious charities (for example Baptcare and VincentCare).

Co-operatives, where the tenants conduct most of the management, are an alternative model. They may house either low-income or moderate income people.

The top ten CHAs in terms of number of properties managed at 30 June 2021 are listed in the table.

Sources are the 2020–21 Annual Reports of these organisations, and of other larger CHAs.  

This table includes all CHAs with more than 2,500 properties under management. Taken together, these ten Associations manage more than 55,000 properties, over half the CHP stock. Only three CHAs operate in more than one State. The two largest, CHL and Home in Place, also operate abroad.  

The proportion of the stock actually owned by the CHAs (which can be used as security for borrowing), varies, but the largest association, CHL, is typical with about 20% of their stock owned. The other properties are owned by State and Territory governments and managed by the CHAs. 

There were 17,400 indigenous community housing dwellings in Australia in 2020, more than half of all indigenous social housing. The largest indigenous CHA, Aboriginal Housing, manages about 1,500 dwellings in Victoria, but most indigenous CHPs are very small.

Governance 
In Australia, the term "housing association" refers to larger, growth-oriented 'not-for-dividend' community-housing providers, mostly companies with an unpaid Board. Smaller CHPs may have trust or cooperative structures.

CHPs are strongly regulated to protect tenants, to safeguard public funds and to ensure they remain solvent.

Meeting stringent governance requirements requires a significant effort in larger associations, with hundreds of program requirements to be met. These restrictions limit active management of the stock, as most properties are held under covenants from public housing authorities and cannot be sold.

Operations 
Operating a sizeable CHP may require complex manoeuvres against all sorts of unforeseen exigencies. Numerous opportunities present themselves, but even a small new development may require careful risk assessment and detailed planning.

Funding 
Well-managed CHPs break close to even on renting their stock (compared with public housing, which makes a substantial loss on rentals). As a result, there is no surplus for further acquisitions. Discretionary funds arrive mostly from the largess of governments, in the form of transfers or grants. Side operations such as Transitional Housing have provided a small surplus which may be used to finance modest numbers of acquisitions. 

The larger CHPs have been able to borrow an extra 25% of funding against their equity, though meeting interest payments is difficult without a rental surplus. Borrowing has been made much easier by the NHFIC bond aggregator.

Acquisition 
Because of the huge shortage of affordable rental properties and the underlying demand, CHPs have sought affordable properties whenever and wherever they can be accessed.

Partnerships with local government or charities may provide land for free, so that only the cost of building has to be found.

About 20% of new projects include partnerships with for-profit builders, who may include a proportion of affordable housing in larger projects in order to get various planning benefits. The affordable tenancies are managed by the CHP partner.

Rent-setting 
Rents of individual properties are typically set at 25% to 30% of household income plus Commonwealth Rent Assistance (CRA), which is around break-even against property and tenancy management costs plus corporate overhead.

Tenancies 
Tenants of the CHOs are among the most disadvantaged people in the community. Many suffer from disabilities or are on invalid pensions. The tenants are normally recommended by service agencies or through homelessness services. Various dwellings may be reserved for specific purposes under the terms of their  funding (for example, family violence, prison releases, or mental health). The States have been increasingly targeting their funding to these special needs groups, rather than directly to increasing the stock.

Maintenance 
CHAs usually maintain a centralised call centre for dealing with maintenance requests. For properties owned by the government, requests are fielded to the maintenance arm of the SHA. For self-owned properties, requests are forwarded to preferred subcontractors in each region, in much the same way as commercial property managers do. Some CHPs maintain a dedicated maintenance team.

Social services 
Models for service provision are varied. CHAs may provide evaluation and referral for prospective tenants, but they are property managers, not usually involved in direct provision of social services. Those CHPs with homelessness offices evaluate people in housing difficulty and recommend them to service provision partners  for various forms of assistance, which may include cash or temporary accommodation. The clients that pass into Transitional Housing held by the CHP are referred for some months of appropriate counselling or advocacy services. Many clients are recommended to CHPs by social service agencies and remain in the care of the referring body.

Some CHPs with a strong homelessness focus, like Launch, run Foyers to give young people a safe place to live while studying. Others may have an assertive outreach presence, attending known sites where homeless people sleep.

Support for communities 
Larger CHPs with substantial holdings in a particular area may organise community-building activities, including support for sporting teams, scholarships etc. They may also assist tenants to gain access to employment and education.

Transitional housing 
Those CHPs with a Transitional Housing stock may allocate these properties to people at risk of homelessness while waiting for a permanent public housing placement. Permanent stock has become harder and harder to attain, so some clients have been in Transitional Housing for over two years.

Private rental 
In 2022, several CHPs (Southern Cross, Evolve, Bridge and Launch) were operating not-for profit real estate agencies where interested private landlords could supply housing at below-market rents for longer-term lease to vetted tenants. Demand for these lower-priced rentals always far outstrips supply. Other CHPs operate ‘private rental brokerages’ to assist disadvantaged tenants to overcome hurdles that may prevent their obtaining a private lease.

Monitoring 
The CHPs in most States deliver unit record data to the AIHW and to the Productivity Commission, both of whom produce regular reports, and also to the State Regulatory Authority. Online systems allow data to be uploaded on a daily basis.

History 
Demand for public housing from eligible groups accelerated throughout the 1980s, and public housing waiting lists extended to the point that only the highest-priority clients could be accommodated. In 1987, non-aged single people and people who needed support services to live independently became eligible for public housing for the first time, further increasing demand.

In the late 1980s, the Minister for Social Services Brian Howe and his advisers were aware of the transfer of municipal housing in the United Kingdom and the Netherlands to not-for-profit Housing Associations. The small stock of social housing in Australia was managed entirely through the State public housing authorities, and it was thought that Australia might benefit from alternatives. A Local government and community housing programme was allocated $11 million in 1986–87. It was supposed to encourage greater tenant management, to fill gaps in existing provision, to attract external funds and to involve the community.

Initially, government showed little interest except in New South Wales, where the State government began to engage in innovative arrangements including head-leasing of properties from private landlords and partnerships with private and community developers.

In the 1990s some newly formed housing associations, such as Community Housing Limited (CHL) in Victoria, were able to secure contracts for the management of Transitional Housing, Aboriginal housing or other service-heavy niche operations. This provided these CHAs with basic funds for operation and limited amounts for acquisition of properties.

For those CHAs able to undertake their own property development, the National Rental Affordability Scheme (NRAS), operating from 2009, offered potential for a substantial increase in properties under management. Under the scheme, organisations arranged the construction of affordable housing, to be let to low and moderate income households at 80% of market rent. An indexed annual incentive, initially $8,000, was paid for up to ten years, to supplement the reduced rent. In NSW, 27 CHPs registered for NRAS incentives, the largest number of which was received by Evolve Housing.

The greatest opportunity to increase the stock under management by CHAs has been through transfers of public housing. In 2009, the Housing Ministers Council set a 35% target for community housing as a proportion of social housing. A significant transfer of management took place in South Australia after 2015, with the management of over 5,000 properties transferred to five CHAs. The largest stock transfer took place in New South Wales from 2019, when 14,000 tenancies were transferred to nine CHPs. These ‘whole of location’ transfers allowed government offices to be closed in the affected areas. 

The establishment of the National Housing Finance Investment Corporation in 2018 allowed CHAs with existing borrowing to refinance at a lower interest rate, while other CHAs were able to borrow for the first time.

Under the Big Housing Build in Victoria, the "largest ever investment in social and affordable housing" in Australia, Victorian CHPs   will receive $1.38 billion to develop 4,200 new social housing homes and manage 4,000 more public housing acquisitions. Of these properties, 2,000 will be targeted for renters with a mental illness, and 1,000 for victims of family violence, while 820 dwellings are for indigenous housing.

Indigenous housing 
The management of indigenous housing, particularly in remote communities, has always been a difficult endeavour. From the 1980s,  much ATSI housing held by the States and the Northern Territory was transferred to Indigenous Community Housing Organisations (ICHOs) in the name of self-determination. By 1999 there were 10,900 units in more than 700 ICHOs, about 80% in rural and remote areas. Many of these also had to supply basic infrastructure and municipal services. 

They were managed by a council of indigenous people, who employed among other staff an administrator and a housing officer (often white) to manage the day-to-day affairs of the association or settlements. They contained much substandard housing, particularly in the discrete settlements. Some services including maintenance and accounting proved unaffordable to small organisations.  Some of the smaller CHAs were able to band together and hire these services as a group, while in other cases State and Territory governments continued to provide services off-book.

The duplication of services being delivered by all three spheres of government led to overlap and confusion. To rationalise the situation, some States set up sole housing funding agencies.

Advantages 
From the point of view of government, the main rationale for community housing has been the hope they would find some way of meeting the  need for social housing, given that governments were unprepared to address the cost burden directly. Federal Minister for Housing Mark Arbib said in 2011, "Future demand for overall public housing is estimated to be a 28% increase in underlying demand, or around 93,000 houses, by 2023. In today's dollars that would cost about $25 billion. There is no way that State and Territory Governments backed by the Commonwealth can meet this demand alone. We need the community housing sector to play a key role here."

Community housing does have several financial advantages over public housing as a mode of provision. CHPs have been able to engage in deals with local governments and the private sector to develop affordable housing. They may leverage their asset base and cash flows as security to attract modest levels of private finance and build more affordable homes. The sector’s charitable status helps it to attract philanthropic donations. However, these have been in practice relatively minor advantages, resulting in only a small increase in the number of affordable dwellings.

The most important financial advantage for CHPs has been is that their tenants have been eligible for Commonwealth Rent Assistance (CRA) while public housing tenants are not, and the CRA is passed to the social landlord. This increases the amount of rent paid by clients more nearly to the economic cost of occupation of their dwelling. CRA, for example, raises the amount of rent paid by a single pensioner by 70%. The NSW Minister for Family and Community Services said in 2019, "By transferring management to CHPs we are harnessing over $1 billion of additional funding over 20 years". The extra funds are actually CRA from the Commonwealth.    

Other advantages of community housing over public housing have been:

 they are geared toward organising services for clients with complex needs
 the better-organised CHPs have lower administration costs for tenancy and property management
 they are more skilled at allocating tenants to appropriate properties
 surveys of tenant satisfaction typically show better results in community housing than in public housing. This appears to be because community housing is better maintained (and probably newer).

In general, Labor governments have supported public housing as the preferred mechanism for providing housing for the needy, while conservative Coalition governments have sought to transfer public housing to the community sector.

Footnotes

References

External links 
CHIA. Community housing explained Parliament of Victoria

Housing associations
Public housing in Australia
Homelessness in Australia
Public policy in Australia